Jose Estebin Montero Cruz (born September 4, 1984) is a Dominican professional baseball outfielder, who is currently with the Spain national baseball team. He is the brother of Rhiner Cruz.

Career
He played in the Dominican Summer League for the Detroit Tigers in 2006 and 2007 and for the Nettuno Baseball Club in the Italian Baseball League in 2011.

He played for the Spain national baseball team in the 2007 European Baseball Championship, 2007 Baseball World Cup and 2013 World Baseball Classic.

References

External links

1984 births
Baseball outfielders
Caffe Danesi Nettuno players
Dominican Republic baseball players
Dominican Republic expatriate baseball players in Italy
Dominican Summer League Tigers players
Living people
Spanish baseball players
Spanish people of Dominican Republic descent
Sportspeople of Dominican Republic descent
Sportspeople from Santo Domingo
2013 World Baseball Classic players